Cham Gerdab may refer to:
Cham Gerdab, Ilam
Cham Gerdab, Lorestan